Horace Rumbold may refer to:
Sir Horace Rumbold, 8th Baronet (1829–1913), British diplomat
Sir Horace Rumbold, 9th Baronet (1869–1941), British diplomat
The name should not be confused with the fictional character Horace Rumpole